Aredo FM (Arabic: اذاعة اريدو) is an Iraqi  public radio station but mainly an Arabic-speaking station, broadcasting in many locations throughout the Middle East on AM and FM from Baghdad. It was founded in 2008.

History
Aredo FM started broadcasting in 2008, and Signing a training agreement with Radio Aredo FM – Union Center for Media Training.

References

2008 establishments in Iraq
Arabic-language radio stations
Radio in Iraq
Radio stations established in 2008
Mass media in Baghdad
Mass media in Iraq
Sports radio stations
News and talk radio stations